Covered, A Revolution in Sound is a tribute album produced and released by Warner Bros. Records to commemorate its 50th anniversary as a record label. The album consists of some of the greatest hits from previous and current artists from the late 20th century, while the songs featured on the album themselves are performed by current artists that are signed to Warner Bros. Records. Warner's sister label Elektra Records had done something similar to this nearly 20 years before with an album titled Rubáiyát: Elektra's 40th Anniversary, which featured then-current Elektra artists covering other songs originally released on Elektra or sister label Asylum Records.

Track listing 
 "Just Got Paid" (ZZ Top cover written by Frank Beard, Billy Gibbons, and Bill Ham) - Mastodon (3:35)
 "Her Eyes Are a Blue Million Miles" (Captain Beefheart cover written by Don Van Vliet) - The Black Keys (3:46)
 "A Case of You" (Joni Mitchell cover written by Joni Mitchell) - Michelle Branch (4:17)
 "Here Comes a Regular" (The Replacements cover written by Paul Westerberg) - Against Me! (5:07)
 "More Than This" (Roxy Music cover written by Bryan Ferry) - Missy Higgins (3:02)
 "Into the Mystic" (Van Morrison cover written by Van Morrison) - James Otto (3:44)
 "Like a Hurricane" (Neil Young & Crazy Horse cover written by Neil Young) - Adam Sandler (4:54)
 "You Wreck Me" (Tom Petty cover written by Tom Petty and Mike Campbell) - Taking Back Sunday (2:57)
 "Burning Down the House" (Talking Heads cover written by Talking Heads) - The Used (3:40)
 "Midlife Crisis" (Faith No More written by Michael Bordin, Roddy Bottum, James Martin, and Michael Patton) - Disturbed (4:04)
 "Paranoid" (Black Sabbath cover written by Anthony Iommi, William Ward, Terrence Butler, and John Osbourne) - Avenged Sevenfold (2:44)
 "Borderline" (Madonna cover written by Reggie Lucas) - Flaming Lips with Stardeath & White Dwarfs (5:56)

References 

Covers albums
2009 compilation albums
Warner Records albums